Code Red may refer to:

Arts and entertainment

Literature 
 Code Red, a series of books for teenagers written by Chris Ryan

Television
 Code Red (U.S. TV series), a 1981–82 American television series
 Code Red (Indian TV series), a 2015 Indian television show

Music
 Code Red (Russian band), Russian dance band located in Bonn
 Code Red (British band), a 1990s British boyband

Albums
 Code Red (Cindy Blackman album), 1992
 Code Red (DJ Jazzy Jeff & the Fresh Prince album), 1993
 Code Red (Sodom album), 1999
 Code Red (Monica album), 2015
 Code Red, an album by Blac Youngsta and Moneybagg Yo, 2020

Songs
 "Code Red", hip hop track by American rapper, Jay Rock
 "Code Red", a 2014 single by Super8 & Tab featuring Jaytech
 "Code Red", a song by German thrash metal band Sodom
 "Code Red", a 2020 song by Australian  hard rock band AC/DC

Computing
 Code Red (computer worm), a 2001 computer worm
 Code Red II, a 2001 computer worm

Other uses
 Code Red (medical), an emergency alert code used in hospitals
 Code Red DVD, an independent American home entertainment company specializing in retro grindhouse, exploitation, and horror films
 Code Red, a cherry-flavored variant of the soft drink Mountain Dew
Code Rood, Dutch for "code red" and the name of a climate activist group in the Netherlands

See also
 Red Alert (disambiguation)
 Redcode (disambiguation)